Georges Lacour-Gayet (31 May 1856 – 8 December 1935) was a French historian who taught at the École Navale and the École Polytechnique.
His books on the French navy under Louis XV and Louis XVI are much-quoted and were considered references when published, although they betray his patriotic bias.
His master work was a four-volume biography of Talleyrand.

Life

Georges Lacour-Gayet was born in Marseille on 30 May 1856.
He attended the École normale supérieure at rue d'Ulm, Paris.
His schoolmates included the future geographers Bertrand Auerbach, Marcel Dubois and Paul Dupuy, and the future historians Salomon Reinach and Gustave Lanson.
He became a historian.
On 2 October 1882 he married Cécile Janet (1856–1926), daughter of the philosopher Paul Janet (1823–1899).
Their children were Jacques(fr) (1883–1953), Thérèse (1890–1936) and Robert (1896–1989).

Lacour-Gayet was professor at the École Navale during the period of the Fashoda Incident and the Entente Cordiale.
For many years his La marine militaire de la France sous le règne de Louis XV (Paris, Champion, 1902, 571 pages) was considered the reference work for this subject.
He gave a course of lectures at the Ecole Superieure de Marine that formed the bases for his 1905 La marine militaire de France sous le règne de Louis XVI.
He was also a professor at the École Polytechnique in Paris.
He was a member of the Institut Français, Académie des Sciences Morales et Politiques and the Académie de Marine.
He was a member of the Société de l'histoire de France from 1924, and became a member of the society's council that year.

Lacour-Gayet later had another child, a future historian and journalist Georgette Elgey, from his relationship with Madeleine Léon, who belonged to the Jewish upper-class but later converted to Catholicism; she was the great-granddaughter of Michel Lévy, France's first Jewish general. After he refused to marry her, Léon fought for years for Elgey to be officially recognised as his daughter, eventually losing in court but leaving his reputation in tatters. He died in Paris on 8 December 1935 at the age of 79.

Views

Lacour-Gayet described the colonial competition between France and Britain in the century before 1815 as the "Second Hundred Years War".
He claimed that the efforts of the Académie de Marine prepared the French navy for its "victories in the American War".
This view was not shared by Raoul Castex, who connected the personnel and work of the Academy to the naval defeats of the Seven Years' War (1756–63).
Lacour-Gayet considered that "Suffren, among the grand sailors, is the perfect model."
He had "the spirit of initiative ... the premier quality of a commander, the most necessary, the most truly characteristic, because it is for this that he is chief."

Writing of the year 1758 Lacour-Gayet wrote in La marine militaire de France sous le règne de Louis XVI  (1905), "To the repeated descents of the English on coasts of the Saintonge, the Contentin, and Brittany, had been added the loss of Louisbourg, which portended that of Montreal. ... The course of events led one to the idea of a landing in the British islands; because it was the true means to revenge ourselves with a single stroke, and to finish the war."
Lacour-Gayet was hard on failure.
Charles François Emmanuel Nadeau du Treil(fr), the governor of Guadeloupe, was degraded and condemned to life imprisonment after he lost the island in 1759.
Lacour-Gayet said he deserved the punishment.

Lacour-Gayet's 1905 book on the navy under Louis XVI was written at a time when the loss at Fashoda was still remembered with bitterness and many in France were hostile to England.
He saw the failure of France to invade Britain when they had the chance in 1779 as a great lost opportunity.
The French fleet dominated the English channel and the French army of invasion was ready to embark in transports. He wrote, "Never at any time in history, not even when Napoleon's army lay encamped at Boulogne, was the French navy to near its oft-dreamt-of goal, the invasion of England."

In 1918 Nicolae Petrescu-Comnen contributed an ethnographic overview of Dobruja (La Dobrogea), just as the region was being absorbed into a Greater Bulgaria. Lacour-Gayet presented the work at the Romanian Academy and said the "savant work" of "truth and justice", had exposed the practices of Bulgarisation.

Lacour-Gayet's biography of Talleyrand (4 volumes, 1928–1934) was exhaustively documented.
He studied all of Talleyrand's writings.
He concluded that "the mechanism of the constitution, which had been functioning only a few years, the role of the President, the programs of different parties did not seem to have fixed his attention."
He noted that Talleyrand's observations focused primarily on economics rather than politics, so he could not be called a direct predecessor of Alexis de Tocqueville.

Publications

The Bibliothèque nationale de France records 222 published documents by Lacour-Gayet. 
Documents provided in digitized format on the Gallica website are:

Notes

Sources

1856 births
1935 deaths
20th-century French historians
École Normale Supérieure alumni
Academic staff of École Polytechnique
Members of the Académie des sciences morales et politiques
Writers from Marseille